The Carebaco International is an international badminton tournament of the "Caribbean Regional Badminton Confederation" (Carebaco). Until 1999 the tournament was a closed event eligible only for Carebaco members, but to gain BWF World Ranking points since 1999 the Carebaco International tournament became a level 4 open individual event, now part of the BWF Future Series.

The tournament established since 1972, when four countries in the Caribbean Region with the fanatical badminton enthusiasts started an annual competition among themselves. These countries were Jamaica, Trinidad & Tobago, Suriname and Guyana. As the years progressed the membership of Carebaco increased to include Aruba, Barbados, Bermuda, the Cayman Islands, Cuba, Curacao, the Dominican Republic, Grenada, Guatemala, Haiti, Panama, Puerto Rico, and Martinique.

The Carebaco International is held annually and is part of the Carebaco Games which also include a mixed team event for both seniors and juniors players of Carebaco member and associate member countries. The individual event for juniors is nowadays played in the different age groups comparable to the Pan Am Junior Badminton Championships. Since 2013 there is also an Open Carebaco Junior International U19 part of the Badminton World Federation Future Juniors series eligible for BWF Juniors World Ranking Points.

Carebaco Host Venues

Carebaco Previous winners

Individual Event

Carebaco Team Event Results

References

External links
 Badminton World Federation Tournament
 BWF Fansite
  Jamaica Badminton Association
 Yang Yang Badminton

Badminton tournaments
Badminton
Recurring sporting events established in 1972